Bagas may refer to:

Baga people, of Guinea
Bagas, Gironde, France
Bagaš noble family, in the Serbian Empire
Baga (king) or Bagas, a 3rd-century BC Berber king of ancient Mauretania

See also
 Baga (disambiguation)